Milton Keynes Museum is an independent local museum in the parish of Wolverton and Greenleys in Milton Keynes, England. It is mostly run by volunteers with a small number of paid staff.

The museum is housed in a former Victorian farmstead.
It covers the history of the Milton Keynes area, including northern Buckinghamshire and southern Northamptonshire, from the year 1800 onwards. It includes the Stacey Hill Collection of rural life, consisting of agricultural, domestic, industrial, and social objects connected to the area before the 1967 foundation of Milton Keynes.

There is also a collection of many memorabilia of the nearby Wolverton railway works.

The museum's Connected Earth collection includes a variety of historic telephones and switchboards, many still in working order. 
The museum also has some historic Post Office and British Telecom vehicles. The largest of these is the Road Phone, an enormous working telephone used for promotional purposes.

The museum was previously called the Stacey Hill Museum.

Location
The museum is on the southern outskirts of Wolverton, just off H2 Miller's Way at McConnell Drive.

See also
 History of Milton Keynes

References 

Museums in Buckinghamshire
Buildings and structures in Milton Keynes
Farm museums in England
Rural history museums in England
Local museums in Buckinghamshire
Telecommunications museums in the United Kingdom
Technology museums in the United Kingdom
Railway museums in England